Matheus Henrique do Carmo Lopes (born March 8, 1985 in Sete Lagoas, in the Brazilian state of Minas Gerais) is a Brazilian central defender who plays for Tombense.

External links
 gremio.net
 CBF
 furacao

References

1985 births
Living people
Brazilian footballers
Brazilian expatriate footballers
América Futebol Clube (MG) players
Ipatinga Futebol Clube players
Grêmio Foot-Ball Porto Alegrense players
Club Athletico Paranaense players
C.F. Os Belenenses players
FC Metalurh Zaporizhzhia players
Chengdu Tiancheng F.C. players
Tombense Futebol Clube players
Borneo F.C. players
Centro Sportivo Alagoano players
Paraná Clube players
Primeira Liga players
China League One players
Ukrainian Premier League players
Liga 1 (Indonesia) players
Campeonato Brasileiro Série B players
Campeonato Brasileiro Série C players
Association football defenders
Expatriate footballers in China
Expatriate footballers in Portugal
Expatriate footballers in Ukraine
Expatriate footballers in Indonesia
Brazilian expatriate sportspeople in China
Brazilian expatriate sportspeople in Portugal
Brazilian expatriate sportspeople in Ukraine
Brazilian expatriate sportspeople in Indonesia